TU is an American duo made up of King Crimson members Trey Gunn and Pat Mastelotto in 2002. They have released an official bootleg album, one studio album, one EP, and one live album. The duo's music is largely based on improvisation, sampling, and jazz elements. Gunn and Mastelotto are also members of the supergroup KTU.

TU opened for Tool on the band's 10,000 Days tour on a few dates.

Discography
 Official Bootleg (2005)
 Tu (2007)
 Thunderbird Suite (EP - 2007)
 Tu (Live in Russia) (2011)

References

External links
 Trey Gunn official website
 Pat Mastelotto official website

American musical groups